Megachile gathela is a species of bee in the family Megachilidae. It was described by Cameron in 1908.

References

Gathela
Insects described in 1908